Capel Dewi may refer to the following places in Wales:
 Capel Dewi, Faenor, a hamlet near Aberystwyth, Ceredigion
 Capel Dewi, Carmarthenshire, a village in the community of Llanarthney, Carmarthenshire
 Capel Dewi, Llandysul, a village in the community of Llandysul, Ceredigion